Saint Andrew's Secondary School is a government-aided Anglican boys' secondary school in Potong Pasir, Singapore. It was established in the 19th century, and still operates along traditional British lines. The school offers a four- or five-year programme, leading to the Singapore-Cambridge GCE Ordinary Level or Singapore-Cambridge GCE Normal Level examinations.

History
The school was founded in 1862 by Reverend Edward Sherman Venn. In May 1872, after the Colonial Chaplain, Canon J. A. Beccles, applied to the government for financial aid, Saint Andrew's School became a grant-in-aid institution. The growing school moved from Upper Hokkien Street to Victoria Street and then in 1875 to a four-acre site along Stamford Road.

By the 1920s, the school's enrolment had reached 800 boys. In the 1930s, a system of prefects was instituted, and the school became known for its excellence in boxing and rugby in this period.

A new, larger campus was opened in Woodsville in 1940. More buildings were added in the 1950s, housing both the primary school and secondary school sections.

In 1986, the secondary school moved from Woodsville to a site in Potong Pasir across the Kallang River after the Woodsville buildings were deemed inadequate for the running of both the primary and secondary classes. In mid-2003, the school moved temporarily to the old Victoria School building at Kallang Bahru before returning to new buildings opposite Saint Andrew's Junior School in 2005 as part of the Saint Andrew's Village project, which brings together in one complex the Junior, Secondary and Junior College campuses.

Meanwhile, the old school buildings have been conserved and strengthened for re-use as a church, winning an Honourable Mention in the UNESCO Heritage Awards in 2007.

The Saint Andrew's Village has the first artificial rugby pitch in Singapore, shared between the secondary school and the primary school. It opened in January 2008 at a cost of S$1 million and provides an all-weather surface.

Academics
In 2008, Saint Andrew's was one of eight schools in Singapore to begin offering three new subjects at the Singapore-Cambridge GCE Ordinary Level: Creative 3D Animation, Fundamentals of Electronics, and Introduction to Enterprise Development.

In 2009, Saint Andrew's gained an Academic Value-Added Sustained Achievement Award from the Ministry of Education.

In 2010, the school was commended for including the Saint Andrew's River Programme in its science curriculum. Students investigated the impact on the Kallang River ecosystem and water quality of the building of the Marina Barrage and the enclosure of the Marina Basin.

From 2011, Saint Andrew's offers enhanced enrichment courses for upper secondary students taking the Singapore-Cambridge GCE Ordinary Level examinations in art.

In 2011, the school won the Special Lee Hsien Loong Award for Innovations in Normal Course.

Sporting achievements
Saint Andrew's is one of the traditional "Big Three" rugby schools in Singapore, along with Raffles Institution and Anglo-Chinese School (Independent). The school has won a total of 157 national school titles for rugby since the late 1960s (based on available records). It has also held the Kiwi Cup from 1945 to 2013 inclusive. It has been awarded niche status in rugby by the Ministry of Education.

The school is also strong in hockey. The B Division Hockey Team emerged champions of the B Division Competitions in 2005, 2008 and 2018, as well as the C Division Hockey Team who emerged champions in 2010, 2012 and a recent win over Raffles Institution gave them another national title in 2014. The B Division Hockey Team also recently emerge as champions in the 2016 B Division Hockey Competitions after edging their opponents, Sengkang Secondary, in the finals with a score of 2-0. In cricket, Saint Andrew's was under-17 champions in 1996, 1997, 1998, 2001, 2002 and 2003.

School culture
Despite being an Anglican school, it is not a requirement for students to be Christian. Saint Andrew's has a house system comprising five houses: Gomes, Hose, Loyfatt, Romanis and Venn. The school regards its system of prefects as an important element in maintaining an ethos of service and high standards of conduct.

School uniform
All students wear white short-sleeved shirts bearing the school badge. Lower secondary boys (Secondary 1 and 2) wear dark blue short trousers with white socks; Bermuda shorts are not permitted. Upper secondary boys (Secondary 3 onwards) wear dark blue long pants, although Secondary 3 students have been allowed to do so only since the 1990s. The prefects in upper secondary wear white long pants. The school tie is to be worn on Mondays and at special events.

Discipline
Saint Andrew's maintains strict rules for behaviour inside and outside the school. There is a new system of demerit points, used in combination with the school's long-standing policy of corporal punishment in the form of caning on the palm of the hand or on the buttocks over clothing. Students who accumulate three or four demerit points in a term may be punished with Corrective Work Action (CWO) or caning on the hand. Students who have five or more demerit points in a term would be caned on the buttocks. Students who are late to school four times in a term will be caned on the hand, and will be caned again on each subsequent lateness for that term. Students caught smoking or in possession of tobacco products are referred to the Health Sciences Authority to be fined and counselled, as well as being caned on the buttocks. For very serious offences such as drug abuse, or a second or subsequent offence of fighting or gangsterism, the student may be caned on the buttocks in front of his class or in front of the entire school population during assembly. A public caning is mandatory in a case where the Police are involved. For a repeat serious offence, the student may be publicly caned and then either suspended or expelled.

After a series of bullying cases attracted attention in 2003, the school stated that the situation at Saint Andrew's was no worse than at any other school, adding that bullies receive a stern warning; recalcitrant offenders or those who injure others are caned and ultimately expelled. A Saint Andrew's student caught bringing pornography to school would be caned either in public or in class, depending on the seriousness of the case.

For cases where the offence has a victim or where there is conflict to be resolved, a system of Restorative Practices is in place. "In the process of resolving the conflict, the offenders are asked to suggest the appropriate consequences for their action, which may include any form of punishment. However, any students who fail to cooperate with the teacher will be dealt with differently."

Notable alumni
 S. Iswaran, Minister for Transport
 J. B. Jeyaretnam, opposition politician
 Kishore Mahbubani, academic and former diplomat
 David Saul Marshall, first Chief Minister of Singapore
 Benjamin Sheares, second President of Singapore
 Eddie Teo, chairman of the Council of Presidential Advisers

Affiliated schools
 St Andrew's Junior College

References

External links
 Official website
 School National Cadet Corps

Secondary schools in Singapore
Educational institutions established in 1862
Toa Payoh
1862 establishments in the British Empire
Schools in Central Region, Singapore